Buttercup is a populated settlement located in the nation of Belize. It is a mainland village that is located in Belize District.

Populated places in Belize District